Truthful Tulliver is a 1917 American silent Western film directed by William S. Hart and starring Hart, Alma Rubens and Nina Byron. Footage was featured in Decasia, an American collage film by director Bill Morrisson.

Plot 
Truthful Tulliver is a frontiersman turned newspaper editor who sets up shop in Glory Hole, a lawless border town. While standing at the news office window with Easterner York Cantrell, Truthful sees two sisters, Grace and Daisy Burton, being insulted by drunken customers of the 40 Red Saloon. "Deacon" Doyle manages the saloon but Cantrell secretly owns it. The next day, Truthful runs an editorial in his paper condemning the 40 Red Saloon. Truthful rides his horse into the saloon, lassos Doyle, and drags him behind his horse out of town. Later, Doyle returns and attempts to shoot Truthful. Meanwhile, Daisy confesses to Grace that Cantrell has wronged her and Grace tells this to Truthful. Truthful, who is in love with Grace, misunderstands and thinks Grace wants Cantrell. As Cantrell tries to leave town, Truthful intercepts him. They clear up the misunderstanding, Cantrell decides to marry Daisy, and Truthful embraces Grace warmly.

Cast
 William S. Hart as Truthful Tulliver 
 Alma Rubens as Grace Burton 
 Nina Byron as Daisy Burton 
 Norbert A. Myles as York Cantrell 
 Walter Perry as Silver Lode Thompson 
 Milton Ross as Deacon Doyle

References

Bibliography
 Ronald L. Davis. William S. Hart: Projecting the American West. University of Oklahoma Press, 2003.

External links
 

1917 films
1917 Western (genre) films
Films directed by William S. Hart
American black-and-white films
Triangle Film Corporation films
Silent American Western (genre) films
1910s English-language films
1910s American films